Alfred Stabell (30 January 1862 – 25 March 1942) was a Norwegian sport shooter. He was born in Oslo, and his club was Christiania Skytterlag. He competed in trap shooting at the 1912 Summer Olympics in Stockholm.

References

1862 births
1942 deaths
Shooters at the 1912 Summer Olympics
Olympic shooters of Norway
Norwegian male sport shooters
Sportspeople from Oslo
20th-century Norwegian people